The Port of Keelung, also known as Keelung Harbor, is located in the vicinity of Keelung City, Taiwan. It is operated by Taiwan International Ports Corporation, Taiwan's state-owned port management company.

History
The 1858 Treaty of Tientsin specified Tamsui as an open port. The Port of Keelung opened a few years later in 1886. In the Japanese colonial period, the Governor-General of Taiwan started the development of Keelung Harbor. By the early and middle 20th century, it was the largest port in Taiwan at the time.  The Port of Keelung brought prosperity to the city of Keelung, with Keelung growing into the 4th largest city in Taiwan (after Taipei, Tainan, Kaohsiung).

Following the defeat of the Japanese in the Second World War, the Japanese army retreated from Taiwan through the Port of Keelung.  It was also the main port through which Chinese officials entered Taiwan to take over Taiwan from Japan.  With the rapid economic growth in Taiwan during the 1960s-70s, the Port of Keelung became one of the busiest ports in the world.  In 1984, Port of Keelung was the 7th busiest cargo port in the world.

Architecture

The port forms a narrow waterway with approximately 2,000 meters in length and 400 meters in width that extends from the inner harbor in the southwest to the port mouth in the northwest.

Destinations
The port serves destinations to the Matsu Islands, Xiamen, Okinawa and Keelung Islet.

Transportation
The Port of Keelung is accessible from Keelung Station of the Taiwan Railways.

See also 
Keelung
Santisima Trinidad (Taiwan)
List of East Asian ports
Transportation in Taiwan

References

1886 establishments in Taiwan
Ports and harbors of Keelung
Keelung
Keelung